Iran Compress  (ﺍﻳـﺮﺍﻥ ﻛﻤﭙـﺮﺱ) (or Iran Compress Co. (S.K.A.R) ) is one of the leading manufacturers of industrial heavy equipment in Iran, partnering with companies, such as Iran Khodro Industrial Group and Saipa Group, two major industrial manufacturers in Middle-East. Compressi means "truck tipper" in Persian. The company manufactures truck tippers and other industrial machinery components for domestic and international market.

History

Iran Compress was founded in 1962 to manufacture different types of dumper and relevant equipment. Soon, as a leading manufacturer, it succeeded to cooperate remarkably with local heavy vehicle manufacturing companies like Khavar, Zamyad, Iran Kaveh, etc. To meet local market needs for back truck equipment, Iran Compress improved its business gradually by designing and manufacturing new products for different applications especially in city services details of which can be seen in products section.

Operations

In 2005, Iran Compress Industrial Group started a major restructuring focusing not only on production, but also in import/export of industrial machinery products, transportation, and innovation of new products. This restructuring process resulted in establishment of the following two divisions within Iran Compress Industrial Group:

An import/export division which mainly focuses on importing and distributing steel and a vast range of industrial heavy machinery for domestic need.

Production and manufacturing of industrial heavy equipments, such as tippers for Dump trucks and other hydraulic components for domestic & international markets.

Products

Dump Trucks
Heavy Tipper Equipment; Loading capacity: 16m³, Unloading capacity: up to 35MT, Can be installed on chassis of 6x4 trucks. Suitable for all types of construction works.
Tipper Equipment with Horizontal Walls; For 8 x 4 trucks Loading capacity: 19 - 22m³, Unloading capacity: up to 45MT. Suitable for construction and mine works.
Classic Tipper Equipment; For 4x2 trucks, Loading capacity: 10m³, Unloading capacity: up to 25MT, Suitable for civil and construction works.
Light Tipper Equipment; For 4x2 trucks, Loading capacity: 3-5m³, Unloading capacity: up to 10MT, Suitable for civil and construction works.
Dump Truck Equipment; For 4x6 trucks, Loading capacity: 13-15m³, Unloading capacity: up to 35MT, Suitable for mines and civil constructions.
HARDOX tipper equipment; Tipper equipment, made of HARDOX 450, with hydraulic back door, in assistance with Foulad Sab Karan, Iran and WEBER, Germany.
3-Way tipper equipment ; Ability to unload the cargo from 3 ways and changing to a small flat truck. Suitable for all civil and construction work.

Hook Loader Equipment
Sliding and Articulated Hookloader; For 4x2 trucks, Capacity: Up to 8MT, Length of mounting platform: 3500mm, Loading angle: 27˚, Unloading angle: 48˚, Capacity: 5MT, Hydraulic pressure: up to 250 bar. Suitable for civil and construction works.

Garbage Transportation Equipment
Mini Pack Garbage Carrier;
Large Garbage Transportation Equipment;

Sliding Recovery Equipment

Hydraulic Towing System

Truck-Mounted Cranes

Iran Compress Industrial Group (ICIG) has vast degree of expertise in heavy equipment production and machine development in Europe and in Middle-East.

See also
List of Major Iranian Companies
Iran Khodro Diesel
Saipa Group

Truck manufacturers of Iran
Manufacturing companies based in Tehran